is a Japanese footballer currently playing as a defender for Azul Claro Numazu.

Career statistics

Club
.

Notes

References

1998 births
Living people
Association football people from Ibaraki Prefecture
Sanno Institute of Management alumni
Japanese footballers
Association football defenders
J3 League players
Kashima Antlers players
Azul Claro Numazu players